Massachusetts Question 1 may refer to:

Abolishing the state income tax, 2002 ballot
Sale of wine by food stores, 2006 ballot
Massachusetts State Income Tax Repeal Initiative, 2008 ballot
Massachusetts No Sales Tax for Alcohol Initiative, 2010 ballot
Massachusetts Right to Repair Initiative, 2012 ballot
Massachusetts Automatic Gas Tax Increase Repeal Initiative, 2014 ballot
Massachusetts Expand Slot Machine Gaming Initiative, 2016 ballot
Nurse-Patient Assignment Limits, 2018 ballot
Massachusetts Right to Repair Initiative (2020), 2020 ballot

Politics of Massachusetts